Nuclear data represents measured (or evaluated) probabilities of various physical interactions involving the nuclei of atoms. It is used to understand the nature of such interactions by providing the fundamental input to many models and simulations, such as fission and fusion reactor calculations, shielding and radiation protection calculations, criticality safety, nuclear weapons, nuclear physics research, medical radiotherapy, radioisotope therapy and diagnostics, particle accelerator design and operations, geological and environmental work, radioactive waste disposal calculations, and space travel calculations.

It groups all experimental data relevant for nuclear physics and nuclear applications. It includes a large number of physical quantities, like scattering and reaction cross sections (which are generally functions of energy and angle), nuclear structure and nuclear decay parameters, etc. It can involve neutrons, protons, deuterons, alpha particles, and virtually all nuclear isotopes which can be handled in a laboratory.

There are two major reasons to need high-quality nuclear data: theoretical model development of nuclear physics, and applications involving radiation and nuclear power. There is often an interplay between these two aspects, since applications often motivate research in particular theoretical fields, and theory can be used to predict quantities or phenomena which can lead to new or improved technological concepts.

Nuclear Data Evaluations
To ensure a level of quality required to protect the public, experimental nuclear data results are occasionally evaluated by a Nuclear Data Organization to form a nuclear data library. These organizations review multiple measurements and agree upon the highest-quality measurements before publishing the libraries. For unmeasured or very complex data regimes, the parameters of nuclear models are adjusted until the resulting data matches well with critical experiments. The result of an evaluation is almost universally stored as a set of data files in Evaluated Nuclear Data File (ENDF) format. To keep the size of these files reasonable, they contain a combination of actual data tables and resonance parameters that can be reconstructed into pointwise data with specialized tools (such as NJOY).

Nuclear Data Organizations
The International Network of Nuclear Reaction Data Centres (NRDC) constitutes a worldwide cooperation of nuclear data centres under the auspices of the International Atomic Energy Agency. The Network was established to coordinate the worldwide collection, compilation and dissemination of nuclear reaction data.
 The Cross Section Evaluation Working Group (CSEWG) is the National Nuclear Data Organization of the United States and Canada. This is a cooperative effort of the national laboratories, industry, and universities that produces the ENDF/B file.
 The Joint Evaluated Fission and Fusion File (JEFF) organization consists of members of the Nuclear Energy Agency (NEA) of the Organisation for Economic Co-operation and Development (OECD). They produce the JEFF file, which is also in the universal ENDF format.
 The Japanese Nuclear Data Committee (JNDC) handles the Japanese Evaluated Nuclear Data Library (JENDL). This effort is coordinated through the Nuclear Data Center at the Japan Atomic Energy Agency (JAEA).

Releases of ENDF/B Files

The historical releases of ENDF/B files are summarized below. 

The historical releases of JEFF files are summarized below.

See also
 Nuclear reaction
 Nuclear force

External links
XSPlot an online nuclear cross section plotter
International Network of Nuclear Reaction Data Centres (NRDC)
Introduction to the ENDF Formats
IAEA Nuclear Data Section: Nuclear Data Services
National Nuclear Data Center: Brookhaven National Laboratory
JAEA Nuclear Data Center
Joint Evaluated Fission and Fusion File (JEFF)
Cross Section Evaluation Working Group (CSEWG) 
Data Formats for ENDF-6
T-2 Nuclear Information Service
JANIS NEA Nuclear Data Information System

References

Data, nuclear